Leganés is a city in the Community of Madrid, Spain. Considered part of the Madrid metropolitan area, it is located about 11 km southwest of the centre of Madrid. , it has a population of 188,425, making it the region's fifth most populated municipality. It covers an area of 43.09 km2 and it is located at 667 m over sea level.

Leganés houses a branch of the Universidad Carlos III. It is connected to Madrid via the Cercanías (train, line C5), and Metrosur, one of the lines of Metro. Leganés has 6 Metrosur stations.

On 3 April 2004 five of the suspects in the 11 March 2004 Madrid attacks blew themselves up in an apartment building in the city as police moved in to arrest them. All five were killed, along with one GEO police officer.

Etymology 
Leganés is described in the 16th century annals as a corruption of Leganar. The latter supposedly makes reference to the abundance of légamo (slime) in the area in ancient times.

Geography 

The city is located in the central part of the Iberian Peninsula, at roughly 667 metres above sea level. The urban core is surrounded by motorways, including: M-40, A-42, R-5, M-45 and the M-50.

History 
The founding of the settlement has been tentatively traced back to circa 1280. Throughout the Middle Ages, it remained a small hamlet, of which little information has transcended. By the 16th century it was part of the Land of Madrid. Sold by the Crown, it became a mayorazgo in 1626.

Sports and leisure

The city has a wide range of shops and family centres, especially surrounding the area of Parquesur. All of the neighborhoods have at least two big parks for recreation. The city is well known for the quality of its restaurants, most of them located in the downtown area or near parks like La Chopera.

The "Pista de Hielo" is a normal-size ice skating rink that trains people from all around Madrid in figure skating and ice hockey. It is also the venue for the Leganés ice hockey team.
Along with the "Pista de Hielo", there are ten sports centres in the city (Polideportivo Europa, Los Frailes, Alfredo Di Stéfano, Olimpia, Butarque, La Cantera). These centres have many facilities including basketball fields, football fields, athletics fields, gymnasiums, saunas, swimming pools and many others.

The city team is the Club Deportivo Leganés, currently playing in Segunda División. Football is the most played sport in Leganés; Leganés being the second city after Madrid in terms of federated clubs in the Autonomous Community of Madrid.

Leganés also has an Official Languages School, in which the residents of the city can study English, French, German, Portuguese, Italian, Russian, or even Spanish (adapted for immigrants). The taxes of the school are paid by the Government of Madrid so that the residents only pay a single fee of €250  a year for any of the languages. There are special discounts to students that study more than one language at the same time and for families that have more than one person studying at it as well.

Some of the neighborhoods also have a cultural centre (San Nicasio, Centro, Zarzaquemada, El Carrascal).

Public health care
The main hospital of Leganés is the Severo Ochoa Hospital, and there are many health care centres in each neighborhood. The city stands out for its research in mental illnesses. There is also one public orphanage, one retirement home and one centre dedicated to the disabled.

Culture
The Museum of Sculpture in is an open-air museum that contains a collection of large-format sculptures that brings together prominent representatives of Spanish sculpture from the twentieth century to the present day.s.
It was officially inaugurated in September 2005, by the Minister of Culture, Carmen Calvo. Some of the works come from the Prado Museum and the Museo Nacional Centro de Arte Reina Sofía.

Leganés has a street named AC/DC in honor of the Australian rock band. The band visited Leganés in order to inaugurate the street. The street sign was frequently stolen until the council decided to paint it on the wall instead of replacing the sign over and over again. There is also a street in Leganés named after the rock band Scorpions.

Parquesur, in Leganés, built in the early 1990s is currently one of the biggest shopping centres in Europe. It was completely refurbished and extended in 2005.

Climate

Twin towns – sister cities

Leganés is twinned with:

 Aigaleo, Greece (1980)
 Arroyo Naranjo, Cuba (1995)
 Conchalí, Chile
 La Güera, Western Sahara (2001)
 Macará, Ecuador (2008)
 Papel Pampa, Bolivia
 Somoto, Nicaragua (1998)

Notable residents
John of Austria
Dani Carvajal
Huecco
Javier Illana
José María Movilla
José Luis Pérez Caminero
Joel Robles
Carlos Sastre

References

External links
Leganés City Hall
University Carlos III of Madrid
Leganés at Google Maps

 
Municipalities in the Community of Madrid